Three is the third studio album by Blue Man Group, released on April 22, 2016 by Rhino Entertainment.

Track listing

Personnel

Vince Verderame, Corky Gainsford – drums
Todd Perlmutter – drums, percussion programming
Todd Waetzig, Jordan Cohen, Jeff Tortora – drums
Chris Dyas – baritone guitar, guitar, zither
Jeff Turlik – guitar, synths, berimbau, bass
Chris Bowen – tubulum
Byron Esteep – chapman stick
Brian Scott – cimbalom
Doug Baldinger – drums
Bill Swartz – drums
Steve Ballstadt – shaker, udu
Marivaldo Dos Santos – timbau, triangle
Yusuke Yamamoto – vibraphone
Jeff Quay – bongo, caxixi
Matt Ramsey – PCV
Rob Swift – samples
Mike Relm – turntables
Mark Frankel – drums, spider drums, phoenix drums, logs
Dave Steele – zither, guitar
Josh Matthews – mandeldrums
Phil Stanton – cimbalom, piano smasher
Dorothy McMillan – voice
Geoff Gersh – zither
Larry Heinemann – lap steel, programming 
Clement J Waldman III – drums
Super Natsuki Tamura – didjeridoo

Reception
The album was generally well received.

Allan Raible said "it may not be for everyone but as on their other two studio offerings the Blue Men show themselves to be gifted musicians." David Seigler said "It has an interesting, mostly rhythmic sound that is identifiably their own." 

Mark Elliott said "Guitars are heavily featured, but there is a distinct electronic element here that was not present quite to the same degree in their previous releases.  Three is certainly within the realm of rock, but one can hear influences of bands such as Kraftwerk here." Simon Sweetmas said "I think Three is easily Blue Man Group’s best set of recordings, and best showcase for the dynamic maximalism the troupe offers"  Cristine Struble praised the use of traditional wooden instruments with modern plastic ones.

References

External links
Three at BlueMan.com

2016 albums
Blue Man Group albums
Rhino Entertainment albums